Major General Hamilton Lyster Reed, (23 May 1869 – 7 March 1931) was an Irish British Army officer, and recipient of the Victoria Cross, the highest and most prestigious award for gallantry in the face of the enemy that can be awarded to British and Commonwealth forces.

Early life 
Born in Dublin, he was a grandson of Hamilton Lyster, and a son of Sir Andrew Reed, a distinguished police official. He was educated at the Royal Military Academy, Woolwich, and was gazetted into the Royal Field Artillery as a second lieutenant on 17 February 1888.

Military career
Reed was promoted to lieutenant on 17 February 1891, and to captain on 14 September 1898. Following the outbreak of the Second Boer War in late 1899, he went to South Africa for active service. He took part in the Ladysmith Relief Force, including the Battle of Colenso on 15 December 1899, where he was wounded.

Details on Victoria Cross
He was 30 years old, and a captain in 7th Battery, Royal Field Artillery during the battle of Colenso on 15 December 1899. The detachments serving the guns of the 14th and 66th Batteries, Royal Field Artillery, had all been either killed, wounded, or driven from their guns by Infantry fire at close range, and the guns were deserted. His citation mentions the following deed, for which he was awarded the VC:

Boer War
After the end of regular warfare, the war turned into a guerrilla war in late 1900. During the later part of the war, he served as a Staff Officer, in the position of Deputy Assistant Adjutant-General from 12 June 1901.

The War ended in June 1902, with the Treaty of Vereeniging. Reed left Cape Town in the SS Dilwara in late July, and arrived in Southampton the following month.

Further military service

Reed was seconded to the Turkish Army during the Balkan Wars served with the British Army throughout the First World War. He then served as General Officer Commanding, 52nd (Lowland) Infantry Division from June 1923 until he retired in June 1927.

He died in London on 7 March 1931.

Family
His son Andrew was killed in the Battle of France whilst serving with the RAF.

The Medal
His Medal is part of the Lord Ashcroft collection.

References

Further reading
 The Register of the Victoria Cross (1981, 1988 and 1997)

Ireland's VCs  (Dept of Economic Development, 1995)
Monuments to Courage (David Harvey, 1999)
Irish Winners of the Victoria Cross (Richard Doherty & David Truesdale, 2000)

External links 
 Location of grave and VC medal (Surrey)
London Borough of Richmond
 

1869 births
1931 deaths
Burials in England
British Army major generals
19th-century Irish people
Irish officers in the British Army
Second Boer War recipients of the Victoria Cross
British Army generals of World War I
Companions of the Order of St Michael and St George
Companions of the Order of the Bath
Irish recipients of the Victoria Cross
Military personnel from Dublin (city)
Graduates of the Royal Military Academy, Woolwich
Recipients of the Croix de Guerre 1914–1918 (France)
British Army personnel of the Second Boer War
Royal Artillery officers
British Army recipients of the Victoria Cross